Umlaufgraben is a small river of Bavaria, Germany. It is a branch of the Auer Mühlbach, itself a branch of the Isar, in Munich.

See also
List of rivers of Bavaria

0Umlaufgraben
Rivers of Bavaria
Rivers of Germany